Sharmagne Leland-St. John (b. May 23, 1946)  is an American poet. Leland-St. John is best known for the poem "I Said Coffee," for which she was nominated for the Pushcart Prize in 2007. She has received a total of 21 Pushcart Prize nominations and won the 2013 International Book Award honoring Excellence in Mainstream and Independent Publishing for best poetry anthology.

Early life
Her father Jerome was an animal trapper in the jungles of Tegucigalpa in Honduras. During her childhood, he collected exotic animals with which to supply zoos and private estates. He also had a pheasant farm and quail ranch in Mexico City and eventually settled in Tarzana, California.

Leland-St. John's mother, child actress Roseanne Gahan, worked with Cecil B. DeMille. Gahan married Josephine Moronga Runnels.

When Leland-St. John was three years old, her father left the family, sued for custody, won, and then placed her and her older sister in a Catholic convent. In 1958, her father returned to the U.S. and brought his daughters to live with him and his new wife in Tarzana, which caused his wife to leave him.

Career
In the mid-1960s she met and was dating Peter Yarrow from the folk singing group Peter, Paul and Mary. Through the group's road manager, she was introduced to guitarist Peter Walker with whom she began performing in concert and writing song lyrics. Under the name Peter and the Countess, they performed in venues such as The Fillmore East and West, The Psychedelic Super Market in Boston, The Ark in San Francisco, The Ash Grove in Los Angeles; they also formed the band Orient Express, which included Bruce Langhorne and Lowell George. They also performed the music behind Timothy Leary’s slide shows, "Celebrations"

In the late 1960s, while working for songwriter Jimmy Webb, Leland-St. John began writing poetry and song lyrics and has collaborated with Peter Yarrow, Peter Walker, Darby Slick, Jefferson Airplane, Hedge Capers, Hedge and Donna, Wes Farrell and several other well-known composers. At age 19, she co-wrote two episodes of the TV series "The Beverly Hillbillies." Leland-St. John was close friends with actress Sharon Tate and director Roman Polanski and was living with her boyfriend Jay Sebring until the Manson Family murders in August 1969.

In the 1970s, Leland-St. John acted in TV commercials and appeared in features and on TV. She returned to writing and published seven books of poetry and prose, co-wrote a book on motion picture design, and for the past 20 years, overseen the publication of the online journal Quill and Parchment.

In 2001, she designed her first film Tricks. She co-directed and co-produced the short film Being with Eddie in 2003. Her short film screenplay Butterfly Catcher was filmed by the Native American Film and TV Alliance (NAFATA) in 2004.

With a journalist, she co-wrote the memoir her husband had begun but left unfinished at the time of his death, titled Designing Movies: Portrait of a Hollywood Artist (2006).

Personal life
Leland-St. John was married to Richard Sylbert. They had two children: a boy, Nikolai, who lived for only a few hours (her poem "Tiny Warrior" was written about Nikolai), and a daughter, Daisy Alexandra.

Bibliography
 Unsung Songs (2003)  Quill and Parchment Press
 Silver Tears and Time (2006)  Quill and Parchment Press
 Contingencies (2008)  Quill and Parchment Press USA/WynterBlue Publishing Inc Canada
 Designing Movies: Portrait of a Hollywood Artist (2006)– Greenwood/Praeger 
 La Kalima (2010)  Quill and Parchment Press USA/WynterBlue Publishing Inc., Canada
 Empty Shoes: Poems on the Hungry and the Homeless ~ Editor Patrick T. Randolph  Popcorn Press (Oct. 2009)
 Many Mountains Moving – 
 Literary House Review ~ (Fall 2008)
 Emerging Urban Poets (June 2008)
 The League of Labouring Poets  (Best of Issue Award)
 Villanelles (March 2012); edited by Annie Finch and Marie-Elizabeth Mali; ; Everyman's Library/Random House UK

 Cradle Songs (April 2012) Editor: . Quill and Parchment Press
 Taj Mahal Review, edited by Dr. Santosh Kumar  Publisher: Cyberwit.net Webpage: tajmahalreview.com
 "Charles Manson: The Final Words" (2017)
 "Beverly Hills: 100 Years, 100 Stories" (2017)
 A Raga for George Harrison (October 2020)  Taj Mahal Press/Cyberwit.net
 IMAGES: A Collection of Ekphrastic Poetry  Publisher: Cyberwit.net

References

External links
 
 Sharmagne at Interviewing Hollywood
 Quill & Parchment Poetry Site
 River Run International Film Festival
 

Living people
American production designers
American actresses
American women poets
Year of birth missing (living people)
People from Tarzana, Los Angeles
21st-century American poets
21st-century American women writers
Women production designers